Chile–Japan relations are the diplomatic relations between Chile and Japan. Both nations are members of the Asia-Pacific Economic Cooperation, Comprehensive and Progressive Agreement for Trans-Pacific Partnership, Forum of East Asia–Latin America Cooperation and the Organisation for Economic Co-operation and Development.

History

Early relations
Early knowledge of Chile and Japan would have been through Spanish merchants who traded via the Manila Galleon from Acapulco, Mexico and Manila, Philippines as well as through Spanish missionaries. In Manila, the Spanish traded with Japanese merchants and brought their products to Spanish America (as Chile at the time was part of the Spanish Empire. In 1818, Chile declared its independence from Spain. In 1860, a Japanese ship arrived to the Chilean port of Valparaíso. In October 1868, Japan entered the Meiji period and began fostering diplomatic relations with several nations, after decades of isolation. In 1890, Chile opened a consulate in the Japanese port-city of Yokohama.

In 1894, Chile sold Japan a naval ship called Esmeralda III. Japan re-batized the ship as the Izumi. In September 1897, Chile and Japan officially established diplomatic relations with the signing of the Treaty of Friendship, Commerce and Navigation. That same year, Chile opened a diplomatic legation in Tokyo and two years later, the first Chilean ambassador arrived to Japan and presented his credentials to the Meiji Emperor. In 1909, Japan opened a diplomatic legation in Santiago.

World War II and Post-War Relations 
In January 1943, Chile severed diplomatic relations with the Axis powers during World War II and at the time only declared war on Germany and Italy. In April 1945, Chile declared war on Japan, although it began imprisoning Japanese nationals in 1943. Like most Latin-American nations, Chile did not physically participate in the war. Diplomatic relations between Chile and Japan were re-established in 1952.

In 1959, Nobusuke Kishi, became the first Japanese Prime Minister to visit Chile. After the restoration of democracy in Chile, Patricio Aylwin became the first Chilean President to visit Japan in 1992. Since the initial visits, there have been numerous high-level visits between both nations. Chile and Japan are both initial signatories of the Trans-Pacific Partnership, an agreement that they worked closely with ten other Pacific Rim nations. Since the United States withdrew from the agreement in January 2017, Chile and Japan have worked with the remaining nine countries and signed the Comprehensive and Progressive Agreement for Trans-Pacific Partnership in March 2018 in Santiago.

In September 2017, both nations celebrated 120 years of diplomatic relations. To initiate the celebrations, Japanese Prince Akishino paid a 10-day visit to Chile.

High-level visits

High-level visits from Chile to Japan
 President Patricio Aylwin (1992)
 President Eduardo Frei Ruiz-Tagle (1994, 1995 & 1997)
 President Ricardo Lagos (2003)
 President Michelle Bachelet (2007 & 2018)
 President Sebastián Piñera (2010 & 2012)

High-level visits from Japan to Chile
 Prime Minister Nobusuke Kishi (1959)
 Prince Hitachi (1993 & 1997)
 Prime Minister Ryutaro Hashimoto (1996)
 Prime Minister Junichiro Koizumi (2004)
 Prime Minister Shinzō Abe (2014)
 Prince Akishino (2017)

Bilateral relations
Both nations have signed several bilateral agreements such as a Treaty of Friendship, Commerce and Navigation (1897); Treaty of Peace (1951); Agreement on Technical Cooperation (1978); Agreement to establish the Japan International Cooperation Agency in Chile (1988); Agreement to establish a Japanese volunteer program to ensure technical cooperation between both nations (1996); Agreement on the Assessment of Carbon Fixing in Chilean Forest Ecosystems (2005) and an Agreement on the Avoidance of Double Taxation and Tax Evasion (2016).

Trade
In 2006, Chile and Japan signed a free trade agreement which entered into force in November 2007. In 2017, trade between Chile and Japan totaled US$8.3 billion (911 billion Yen). Chilean exports to Japan include: copper and copper ore, fish (salmon & trout), woodchips, lithium and molybdenum. Japanese exports to Chile include: autos and auto parts, tires, construction and mining equipment. Japanese direct investment in 2016 to Chile totaled US$237 million. Several well known multinational Japanese companies such as Honda, Sony, Toshiba, Nissan, Komatsu and Toyota (among others) operate in Chile.

Resident diplomatic missions
 Chile has an embassy in Tokyo.
 Japan has an embassy in Santiago.

See also
 Japanese Chileans

Further reading 

 Iacobelli, P. (2020). Japan's Intelligence Network in Chile During the Second World War. Journal of Contemporary History.

References 

 
Japan
Bilateral relations of Japan